My Generation is a general knowledge trivia show. Hosted by Jeff Phillips and later Tony Johnston on the Nine Network in 1995–1996, each episode would be played by two 2-member teams, each consisting of a kid and an adult.
 
There would be a board of general topics and both teams would try to answer a question to determine who got to pick the topic. 30 seconds was given to answer a series of questions on that topic and would keep going until all the options had gone.
 
Then there would be a round where both generations would play a video game where they would switch over in between, mostly Ridge Racer on PlayStation.
 
Then in the final round, the teams were given 90 seconds of questions.

Nine Network original programming
Australian children's television series
Australian children's game shows
1995 Australian television series debuts
1996 Australian television series endings
1990s Australian game shows